Vadeshwar is a village in Mawal taluka of Pune district in the state of Maharashtra, India.

Administration
The village is administrated by a sarpanch, an elected representative who leads a gram panchayat. In 2019, the village was itself the seat of a gram panchayat.

Demographics
At the 2011 Census of India, the village comprised414 households. The population of 2231 was split between 1129 males and 1102 females.

See also
List of villages in Mawal taluka

References

Villages in Mawal taluka